The Angola Music Awards (AMA) is an organization of Mener Group with special partnership of the Angolan Ministry of Culture. It is held annually and included in the official program of Fenacult. The awards highlight the work of the popular artists and creators of Angolan music.  

AMA's main aim is the cultural value of music of Angola, the promotion of new values and a tribute to creators and performers who have made the history of country music.

2015 edition
The 2015 Angola Music Awards was held on May 30, 2015 in the eastern province of Lunda Sul. This marked the first time the award show was hosted outside of the capital city Luanda.

Winners

Best Musical Producer: "Filho dessa luta" Mvula / Miguel Camilo

Album of the Year: "Filho Meu" Yola Semedo

Group of the Year: "Kwatsiru" Tchobari

Best Eastern Popular Music Angola: "É mamé" Lemba Catchiokwe

Best North Popular music Angola: "Matonti" Kyaku Kyadaff

Best Semba, "Você me abana" Yola Semedo

Best Gospel: "Meu Tudo" Angospel

Best Afro-Jazz / World Music: "Ame Ndu Ku Sole" Totó ST

Best Afro-House / Dance, "Encosta na dama do outro" Bebucho Q Kuia

Best Rap / Hip-Hop: "Mesmo Assim" NGA

Artist of the Year: Anna Joyce

Best R & B / Soul, "Curtição (A resposta)" - Anna Joyce

Female Artist of the Year: Yola Semedo

Music D'Ouro, "Curtição (A resposta)" - Ricardo Lemvo

Best Kuduro: "São vocês" Pai Latifa

Best Music Video Clip: "Amor Robótico" Coréon Dú

Best DJ: DJ Paulo Alves

Best Kizomba: "Volta amor" Yola Semedo

Male Artist of the Year: NGA

Song of the Year: "Meu Tudo" Bruna Tatiana

2014 edition

The 2nd edition gala of the Angola Music Awards was held on September 13, 2014 in Luanda. The show was broadcast nationally and internationally by TPA, African Music Channel, and RTP channels.

Winners

Album of the Year  -  "A Dor do Cupido" Anselmo Ralph

Best Female Artist – Ary

Best Male Artist - Anselmo Ralph

Best Upcoming Artist – Kyaku Kyadaff

Best Musical Group - Café Negro

Best Afro-House/Dance – "Mwangolé" Djeff Afrozila

Best Afro-Jazz/ World Music – "Luandense" Sandra Cordeiro

Best Gospel – "Zungueira" Irmã Sofia

Best Kizomba – "Entre Sete Sete & Rosa" Kyaku Kyadaff

Best Kuduro – "Filho de Deus" W King

Best Central Angolan Pop Music - "Velho Xico" Nelo Carvalho

Best East Angolan Pop Music - "Mulekeleke" Gabriel Tchiema

Best North Angolan Pop Music – "ZUNGUEIRA" Irmã Sofia

Best South Angolan Pop Music – "Efiya Dange" Miss Olívia

Best Musical Producer – "Homenagem" DJ Dias Rodrigues

Best R&B/Soul – "Única Mulher" Anselmo Ralph

Best Rap/Hip-Hop – "Fuba" Elenco de Luxo

Best Semba – "Monami" Eddy Tussa

Best Video – "Set me Free (Zouk Kizombada Remix)" Coréon Dú

Best DJ – Paulo Alves

Golden Song – "Vovó Angola" Nelo Carvalho

Song of the Year – "Entre Sete Sete & Rosa" Kyaku Kyadaff

Most Requested Song – "Tunga Né" Paulo Garcia

Most Popular Web Artist - Anselmo Ralph

References

Angolan music
African music awards